Jerome Bonaparte Cory (June 17, 1837 – January 23, 1892) was a member of the Wisconsin State Assembly.

Biography
Cory was born on June 17, 1837 in Greene Township, Trumbull County, Ohio. Following the outbreak of the American Civil War, he initially enlisted with the 19th Ohio Infantry of the Union Army and took part in events that include the Battle of Rich Mountain. Later, he settled in Patch Grove (town), Wisconsin and served as an Army surgeon past the end of the war. Cory married Amanda McLean. They had nine children. He died on January 23, 1892.

Assembly career
Cory was a member of the Assembly during the 1872 session. He was a Republican.

References

External links
Ancestry.com

1837 births
1892 deaths
People from Trumbull County, Ohio
People from Grant County, Wisconsin
Republican Party members of the Wisconsin State Assembly
People of Ohio in the American Civil War
People of Wisconsin in the American Civil War
Union Army soldiers
Union Army surgeons
Physicians from Wisconsin
Burials in Colorado
19th-century American politicians